Bassèré is an abandoned settlement in Ziguinchor Department of the Ziguinchor Region in the Basse Casamance area of south-west Senegal, near the border with Guinea-Bissau. The population in 2002 was 98 but the residents of Bassèré have been dispersed by the Casamance Conflict

External links
PEPAM

Populated places in the Ziguinchor Department